Mark Burstein is an American academic administrator who served as the 16th president of Lawrence University. He took office on July 1, 2013, succeeding Jill Beck. Burstein previously served as an Executive Vice President at Princeton University from 2004 to 2013.

Early life and education 
Raised in Cedar Grove, New Jersey, Burstein graduated from Cedar Grove High School in 1979 and was an active member of the Young Judaea organization.

Burstein received a Bachelor of Arts degree as a history and independent studies at Vassar College in 1984, where he was awarded the Catlin Prize for outstanding contribution to the college community. He received a Master of Business Administration degree from the Wharton School of the University of Pennsylvania.

Career 
Burstein began his career in public services, banking and consulting. He held positions at the New York City Department of Sanitation, Bear Stearns, and the Center for Applied Research. He also served on the New York City Mayor's Applied Sciences Advisory Board. He was the chair of directors of the national political action committee LGBTQ Victory Fund from 2008 to 2010.

Prior to assuming his role at Princeton University, Burstein worked at Columbia University, where he was the Vice President for Facilities Management, Vice President for Student Services, and acting Vice President for Human Resources.

In September 2020, Burstein announced that he would retire as president of Lawrence University at the end of the 2020–2021 school year. Burstein cited his desire to return to the East Coast to be closer to his parents.

Personal life 
Burstein married David Calle in November 2009. Calle is businessman and graduate of the University of Pennsylvania and MIT Sloan School of Management.

References

External links
 Office of the President of Lawrence University-Mark Burstein

Living people
Columbia University staff
People from Cedar Grove, New Jersey
Princeton University staff
Presidents of Lawrence University
Vassar College alumni
Wharton School of the University of Pennsylvania alumni
Year of birth missing (living people)